Serena-Maneesh 2: Abyss in B Minor (stylized as either S-M 2, #2, or No. 2) is the second studio album by Serena Maneesh. The album was recorded over a period of two years, and was partly recorded in a cave outside of Oslo, Norway, according to frontman Emil Nikolaisen:

The album features the single "Ayisha Abyss," released as a limited edition 12" single (backed with the exclusive B-side "Call-Back from a Dream") on January 18, 2010. A music video for the song "I Just Want to See Your Face" premiered on 4AD's website on March 12, 2010.

Track listing
All tracks written by Emil Nikolaisen.

 "Ayisha Abyss" – 7:47
 "I Just Want to See Your Face" – 2:19
 "Reprobate!" – 3:39
 "Melody for Jaana" – 5:53
 "Blow Yr Brains in the Mourning Rain" – 4:28
 "Honeyjinx" – 4:25
 "D.I.W.S.W.T.T.D." – 2:51
 "Magdalena (Symphony #8)" – 6:06

Release history

Credits

Production
 Produced and edited by Emil Nikolaisen.
 Recorded and overdubbed by Christian Engfelt in the bunker and at CSX.
 Mixed by Nick Terry at The Strongroom, except:
 "Reprobate!" mixed at Harry's Gym Recording Studios.
 "Blow Yr Brains" and "D.I.W.S.W.T.T.D." mixed at Grandsport.
 Additional overdubbing, editing, and productive ideas by Nick Terry.
 Additional recording and overdubbing by Bjarne Stensli at Harry's, René Tinner at Grandsport, Daniel C. Smith in his NJ recreation room, and Emil Nikolaisen at CSX.
 Gong recorded by Don Dons at Hangaround Sounds.
 Mastered by Ray Staff at Air.
 Master edit by Tom Kvålsvoll at Strype.
 Sleeve design by Dangermüz; assistance by PDW.
 Photography by Lars Petter Pettersen and Ghostkamera.

External links
Serena Maneesh's official website
Serena Maneesh artist page on 4AD's website

References

2010 albums
Serena-Maneesh albums